= Distribution algebra =

In algebra, the distribution algebra $D(G, K)$ of a p-adic Lie group G is the K-algebra of K-valued distributions on G. (See the reference for a more precise definition.)
